Deception Bay may refer to:

Deception Bay, Queensland, a suburb of Brisbane, Australia
Deception Bay (Queensland), the body of water for which it is named
Deception Bay, Quebec, a former trading post of the Hudson's Bay Company
Deception Bay, a 2018 album by Milk & Bone